Jeff Brooks (born June 12, 1989) is an American-born naturalized Italian professional basketball player for Reyer Venezia of the Italian Lega Basket Serie A (LBA) and the EuroCup. He also represents the Italian national team.

College career
After playing high school basketball at Doss High School, in Louisville, Kentucky, Brooks played 4 seasons of college basketball at the Pennsylvania State University, with the Penn State Nittany Lions.

Professional career
On July 20, 2011, he signed with Aurora Basket Jesi of the Italian Legadue Basket for the 2011–12 season.

On July 31, 2012, he signed with Pallacanestro Cantù for the 2012–13 season. With Cantù he won the Italian Supercup and played in the 2012–13 Euroleague.

On August 9, 2013, he signed with Juvecaserta Basket for the 2013–14 season. He was selected to play at the 2014 Serie A All-Star game.

On June 13, 2014, he signed a one-year deal with Dinamo Sassari. With Sassari he won the Italian Serie A and the Italian Cup in 2015.

On July 17, 2015, he signed a two-year deal with Avtodor Saratov. After one season he left Saratov and signed a one-year deal with Spanish club Unicaja. In the 2016–17 season, Brooks won the EuroCup with Unicaja after beating Valencia BC in the Finals.

On June 25, 2018, Brooks signed a two-year deal with Italian club Olimpia Milano. On June 11, 2020, he announced he was returning to the team for a third season.

On July 1, 2021, Brooks, after three years, left Milano and signed a multi-year contract with rivals Reyer Venezia.

Career statistics

Domestic Leagues 

|-
| style="text-align:left;" | 2011–12
| style="text-align:left;" |  Fileni BPA Jesi
| style="text-align:left;" | LegaDue
| 28 || 35.0 || 56.6% || 40.9% || 77.4% || 6.9 || 0.9 || 1.7 || 0.4 || 17.0
|-
| style="text-align:left;" | 2012–13
| style="text-align:left;" |  Lenovo Cantù
| style="text-align:left;" | Serie A
| 43 || 24.3 || 50.6% || 32.7% || 77.1% || 4.9 || 0.9 || 0.7 || 0.7 || 7.9
|-
| style="text-align:left;" | 2013–14
| style="text-align:left;" |  Pasta Reggia Caserta
| style="text-align:left;" | Serie A
| 30 || 31.4 || 55.1% || 45.2% || 77.0% || 6.3 || 1.5 || 1.5 || 0.5 || 14.4
|-
| style="text-align:left;" | 2014–15
| style="text-align:left;" |  Banco di Sardegna Sassari
| style="text-align:left;" | Serie A
| 21 || 28.3 || 44.4% || 31.9% || 81.6% || 7.5 || 1.3 || 0.9 || 0.6 || 8.7
|-
| style="text-align:left;" | 2015–16
| style="text-align:left;" |  Avtodor Saratov
| style="text-align:left;" | VTB United League
| 26 || 27.3 || 53.9% || 41.9% || 78.5% || 5.8 || 2.2 || 1.2 || 0.3 || 11.0
|-
| style="text-align:left;" | 2016–17
| style="text-align:left;" |  Unicaja Málaga
| style="text-align:left;" | Liga ACB
| 38 || 20.4 || 49.3% || 27.5% || 82.6% || 4.0 || 1.0 || 0.6 || 0.3 || 6.9
|-
| style="text-align:left;" | 2017–18
| style="text-align:left;" |  Unicaja Málaga
| style="text-align:left;" | Liga ACB
| 33 || 20.5 || 48.3% || 37.8% || 89.4% || 4.3 || 0.9 || 0.5 || 0.2 || 8.5
|-
| style="text-align:left;" | 2018–19
| style="text-align:left;" |  AX Armani Exchange Milano
| style="text-align:left;" | Serie A
| 35 || 22.5 || 55.0% || 33.3% || 78.7% || 4.5 || 1.0 || 0.7 || 0.5 || 5.9

European Competitions 

|-
| style="text-align:left;"| 2012–13 Euroleague
| style="text-align:left;"|  Mapooro Cantù
| 10 || 3 || 23.5 || 36.7% || 10.0% || 55.6% || 4.9 || 1.3 || 0.6 || 0.0 || 8.3 || 9.2
|-
| style="text-align:left;"| 2014–15 Euroleague
| style="text-align:left;"|  Dinamo Banco di Sardegna Sassari
| 8 || 8 || 29.1 || 52.8% || 47.1% || 76.9% || 5.0 || 1.3 || 2.0 || 0.6 || 9.3 || 13.0
|-
| style="text-align:left;"| 2015–16 Eurocup
| style="text-align:left;"|  Avtodor Saratov
| 13 || 12 || 30.7 || 57.0% || 38.5% || 89.6% || 8.2 || 2.4 || 1.2 || 0.5 || 13.1 || 21.3
|-
| style="text-align:left;"| 2016–17 Eurocup
| style="text-align:left;"|  Unicaja Málaga
| 22 || 21 || 22.7 || 45.1% || 36.1% || 71.4% || 4.2 || 1.0 || 0.6 || 0.4 || 7.3 || 8.3
|-
| style="text-align:left;"| 2017–18 Euroleague
| style="text-align:left;"|  Unicaja Málaga
| 26 || 23 || 22.9 || 50.0% || 39.5% || 78.0% || 4.3 || 1.0 || 0.6 || 0.4 || 8.8 || 9.8
|-
| style="text-align:left;"| 2018–19 EuroLeague
| style="text-align:left;"|  AX Armani Exchange Milano
| 29 || 29 || 25.1 || 50.0% || 39.6% || 83.3% || 5.3 || 1.0 || 0.8 || 0.3 || 6.0 || 8.6

Italian national team

|-
| style="text-align:left;"| 2019
| style="text-align:left;"| FIBA World Cup
| style="text-align:left;"|  Italy
| 5 || 0 || 17.0 || 56.2% || 33.3% || 66.7% || 4.2 || 1.0 || 1.6 || 1.2 || 4.4

Personal life
Brooks is married to an Italian woman and they have a son.

On September 6, 2018, Brooks became officially Italian. He got the Italian passport and he was registered to FIBA for the upcoming 2019 FIBA Basketball World Cup qualification against Poland and Hungary.

References

External links
 Jeff Brooks at euroleague.net
 Jeff Brooks at fiba.com
 Jeff Brooks at legabasket.it
 Jeff Brooks at realgm.com
 

1989 births
Living people
2019 FIBA Basketball World Cup players
American emigrants to Italy
American expatriate basketball people in Italy
American expatriate basketball people in Russia
American expatriate basketball people in Spain
American men's basketball players
Baloncesto Málaga players
Basketball players from Louisville, Kentucky
BC Avtodor Saratov players
Dinamo Sassari players
Doss High School alumni
Italian expatriate basketball people in Russia
Italian expatriate basketball people in Spain
Italian men's basketball players
Juvecaserta Basket players
Lega Basket Serie A players
Liga ACB players
Naturalised citizens of Italy
Olimpia Milano players
Pallacanestro Cantù players
Penn State Nittany Lions basketball players
Power forwards (basketball)
Reyer Venezia players